Ottawa Street Power Station is a former municipal electric and steam utility generating station for the Lansing Board of Water and Light in Lansing, Michigan, located on the Grand River in the city's central business district that was redeveloped as corporate headquarters for the  Accident Fund Insurance Company of America.

Design and construction

The engineering design of the plant was by Ralph C. Roe and Allen Burns of the firm of Burns and Roe, and represented an improvement over the design of the Bremo Station in Virginia, which the two had designed while employed at Electric Management and Engineering Company. The architectural design was by Edwyn A. Bowd of Bowd and Munson. Construction began in 1937 and, due to material shortages caused by the outbreak of World War II, completed in two phases.  The first phase, which consisted of the southern half of the building, was completed in 1939.  The second phase was completed in 1946.  In total, the project cost $4 million, all of it from ratepayers without the issuance of bonds or government funds.

The design symbolizes the combustion of coal, and graduates from dark purple at the base through reds and orange in the middle, to light yellow at the top, alternating with bands of limestone, and with limestone parapets and trim. The Ottawa Street station was praised for its engineering and architecture in trade publications of the day, and immediately became the city's preeminent Art Deco landmark. Bowd subsequently designed a number of other prominent Art Deco and Streamline Moderne buildings in the Lansing area, including the J.W. Knapp Company Building.

Operating History

The Ottawa Street station provided electricity and steam to the downtown Lansing area from 1939 through 1989.  The plant had a generating capacity of 81,500-kilowatts. By 1971, improvements at the Board of Water and Light's Eckert Station permitted the Ottawa Street Station to operate as a backup station for electric generation.  It continued to provide steam service into the 1980s. In 1984, the Board of Water and Light's Eckert Station  began providing steam service, initially as a backup to the Ottawa Street Station, but eventually as the primary steam service source.  As equipment became obsolete, it was removed from the Ottawa Street Station, and ultimately it was decommissioned in 1992 for electric and steam. In 2001, a portion of the station was renovated to provide chilled water service for air conditioning.  It continued to operate as a water chilling plant until September 2009, when the Board of Water and Light completed a new chilled water plant in downtown Lansing.

Redevelopment

Following decommissioning, the City of Lansing explored various options for redevelopment of the Ottawa Street Station.  In 2007, it was sold to be redeveloped as corporate headquarters for the  Accident Fund Insurance Company of America.  Massive renovations to convert the plant to an office building with a   campus were made over a two-year period by The Christman Company, and completed in the first quarter of 2011.

The redevelopment project won numerous awards, including:
 Richard H. Driehaus National Preservation Honor Award – National Trust for Historic Preservation
 Global Award for Excellence - Urban Land Institute
 Beyond Green High Performance Building First Place Honor Award for a Historic Reuse – National Institute of Building Sciences Sustainable Buildings Industry Council
 Governor's Award for Historic Preservation – Michigan State Housing Development Authority
 Design Award – Michigan Historic Preservation Network
 Construction and Design Award – Engineering Society of Detroit
 Green Project of the Year – Construction Association of Michigan
 Excellence in Economic Development – International Economic Development Council
 IDEAS2 Presidential Award of Excellence – American Institute of Steel Construction.

National Register of Historic Places Listing

The Ottawa Street Station was listed on the National Register of Historic Places on November 26, 2008.

It is the 22nd property listed as a featured property of the week in a program of the National Park Service that began in July 2008.

See also

 National Register of Historic Places listings in Michigan

References

External links
"Ottawa Street Power Station Receives National Designation: New Accident Fund Headquarters Added to National Register of Historic Places", March 18, 2009, a press release at Accident Fund, the owner

National Register of Historic Places in Lansing, Michigan
Buildings and structures in Lansing, Michigan
Former coal-fired power stations in the United States
Art Deco architecture in Michigan
Industrial buildings and structures on the National Register of Historic Places in Michigan
Energy infrastructure on the National Register of Historic Places
Former power stations in Michigan